Chryseobacterium carnipullorum  is a Gram-negative, rod-shaped, non-spore-forming and non-motile bacteria from the genus of Chryseobacterium which has been isolated from a raw chicken from a poultry processing plant in Bloemfontein in South Africa.

References

Further reading

External links
Type strain of Chryseobacterium carnipullorum at BacDive -  the Bacterial Diversity Metadatabase

carnipullorum
Bacteria described in 2013